Andrzej Ajnenkiel (21 February 1931 – 10 April 2015) was a Polish historian. He specialized in the political history of Poland and the history of Polish law, especially constitutional law.

He was a son of Stefan and Janina.

From 1949 to 1954 Ajnenkiel studied law at the University of Warsaw. Since 1979 Ajnenkiel had been a professor at the Institute of History at the Polish Academy of Sciences in Warsaw. In 1991 he gained a professor degree, the highest academic degree in Poland, and later a habilitation. He was a member and director of several historical societies, including the Polish Historical Society.

Works
 Historia ustroju Polski 1764-1939 (1969)
 Administracja w Polsce: zarys historyczny (Administration in Poland: Historical Overview) (1975)
 Parlamentaryzm II Rzeczypospolitej (1975)
 Od rządów ludowych do przewrotu majowego: zarys dziejów politycznych Polski 1918-1926 (1977)
 Polska po przewrocie majowym: zarys dziejów politycznych Polski 1926-1939 (Poland after the May Coup: Overview of the Political History of Poland 1926-1939) (1980)
 Polskie konstytucje (Polish Constitutions) (1991)
 Prezydenci Polski (Presidents of Poland) (1991)
 Konstytucje Polski w rozwoju dziejowym 1791-1997 (2001)

Footnotes

External links
 Profile at Nauka Polska portal

20th-century Polish historians
Polish male non-fiction writers
University of Warsaw alumni
1931 births
2015 deaths
Writers from Warsaw
Historians of Poland
Recipients of the Order of Polonia Restituta
Burials at Bródno Cemetery